Nangna Nokpa Yengningi (English: Want to See You Smile) is a 2015 Indian Meitei language film directed by Ajit Ningthouja, written by Herojit Naoroibam and produced by Th. (O) Bedamani Devi, presented by Poknapham. It stars Bonium Thokchom, and Soma Laishram in the lead roles. The film was released on 6 November 2015 at Bhagyachandra Open Air Theatre (BOAT).

Cast
 Bonium Thokchom as Amujao
 Soma Laishram as Memi
 Sagolsem Dhanamanjuri
 Ratan Lai as Pheijao
 Hamom Sadananda as Memi's brother
 Denny Likmabam as Ibohal
 Merina as Memi's sister-in-law
 Laimayum Gaitri as Matouleibi
 Heisnam Ongbi Indu as Amujao's Mother
 Hamom Purnanda
 Suresh Melei

Production
The shooting of the film completed within 10 days. This film is the first production of Real Screen Picture. The blessing ceremony (yaipha thouni thouram) was held on April 17, 2015.

Accolades
The movie bagged three awards at the 5th SSS MANIFA 2016 held by Sahitya Seva Samiti, Kakching and Film Forum Manipur.

Soundtrack
Amarjit Lourembam composed the soundtrack for the film and Herojit Naoroibam wrote the lyrics. The songs are titled Nangna Nokpa Yengningi and Nangbu Nungshirure.

References

2010s Meitei-language films
2015 films